The 2005 Sunfeast Open was the first edition of the WTA tennis tournament Sunfeast Open held in Kolkata, West Bengal, India for women's professional tennis from 19–25 September 2005. The prize money was US$175,000.

Champions

Singles

  Anastasia Myskina (RUS) defeated  Karolina Šprem (CRO) 6–2, 6–2

Doubles

  Elena Likhovtseva (RUS) /  Anastasia Myskina (RUS)  defeated  Neha Uberoi (United States)  /  Shikha Uberoi (IND) 6–1, 6–0

Entrants

Seeds

 The following players were seeded

Qualifiers

 The following players received entry from the Qualifying Draw.
  Rushmi Chakravarthi
  Ankita Bhambri
  Junri Namigata
  Chuang Chia-jung

Wildcards

 The following players received wildcards into the Main Draw.
  Virginia Ruano Pascual
  Neha Uberoi
  Elena Likhovtseva

References

Sunfeast Open
Sunfeast Open
Sunfeast Open